In chemistry, orthochromasia is the property of a dye or stain to not change color on binding to a target, as opposed to metachromatic stains, which change color. The word is derived from the Greek orthos (correct, upright), and chromatic (color). Toluidine blue is an example of a partially orthochromatic dye, as it stains nucleic acids by its orthochromatic color (blue), but stains mast cell granules in its metachromatic color (red).

In spectral terms, orthochromasia refers to maintaining the position of spectral peaks, while metachromasia refers to a shift in wavelength, becoming either shorter or longer.

In photography, an orthochromatic light spectrum is one devoid of red light.

In biology, orthochromatic refers to the greyish staining because of acidophilic and basophilic mixture in the cell.

Orthochromatic photography 

Orthochromatic photography refers to a photographic emulsion that is sensitive to only blue and green light, and thus can be processed with a red safelight. The increased blue sensitivity causes blue objects to appear lighter, and red ones darker. A cyan lens filter (which removes red light) can be used with standard panchromatic film to produce a similar effect.

Orthochromatic films were first produced by Hermann Wilhelm Vogel in 1873 by adding small amounts of certain aniline-based dyes to photographic emulsions, which until that time had been sensitive to blue light only. This work was extended by others including Josef Maria Eder, who introduced the use of the red dye erythrosine in 1884.

See also
Panchromatic

References 

Photographic film types